Big Bird's Birthday or Let Me Eat Cake is a 1991 television special based on the children's television show Sesame Street. In the special, Big Bird celebrates his sixth birthday. The special aired on PBS stations during the week of March 9, 1991 as part of the PBS pledge drive season. On March 15, the special was re-aired as the Sesame Street episode "2835", with additional inserts from previous episodes added and the pledge break scene removed.

Plot
Snuffy visits Big Bird's nest in the morning so he can be the first to wish Big Bird a happy birthday. During the opening credits, the two head out down the street as Big Bird's friends wish him a happy birthday, then everyone sings about "Big Bird's Beautiful Birthday Bash" in the arbor. The Monsterpiece Theater sketch "The King and I" is repeated from a previous episode. Big Bird and his friends will go to the Wollman Rink in Central Park for his skating party, and Maria and Susan will stay behind to decorate. Snuffy also wants to stay behind because he doesn't know how to roller skate, so Big Bird will teach him how to skate. Robin Williams shows Elmo the fun things he can do with a stick. Everyone enjoys skating at the rink, but Snuffy is not sure he wants to learn how to skate because he fears falling. Big Bird is finally able to convince Snuffy to learn, until someone falls in front of them. The song "We Are All Earthlings" follows. Maria and Susan lay out Big Bird's cake, then go to their apartments to find more chairs. Cookie Monster finds Big Bird's cake and realizes he can't eat it, so he finds other things to eat, starting with the chairs and the table. Grover sings "Monster in the Mirror" along with several celebrities. Monster on the Spot reporter Telly Monster asks if The Count will support his public television station. The Count recites a long list of reasons why, leading to a pledge break.

Snuffy, still afraid of falling, tries to leave the rink. Telly asks Luis where Oscar the Grouch is. Oscar and Bruno are skating at the party because he loves falling down when skating. Bruno skates around without falling, but the skating made Oscar dizzy. Whoopi Goldberg and Hoots the Owl talk about being proud of their body parts. Big Bird impresses Snuffy with a rollerskating routine, but he can't skate like Big Bird. Big Bird and friends sing "Put One Foot in Front of the Other", which helps Snuffy skate around the rink. Cookie Monster has eaten everything around him, and when Susan and Maria come back, they take the cake away from him. The Oinker Sisters sing "A New Way to Walk", repeated from a previous episode. Everyone returns to the street and notices that almost everything has been eaten. Big Bird's friends give him his cake, sing "Happy Birthday To You", and then Big Bird blows out all the candles for his birthday wish. The credits begin as the cake is cut, but stop when Maria wonders where Cookie Monster is; he eats his slice of cake, and the sponsors for dessert. The credits continue as everyone skates at the rink.

Cast
 Alison Bartlett as Gina
 Linda Bove as Linda
 Emilio Delgado as Luis
 Loretta Long as Susan
 Sonia Manzano as Maria
 Bill McCutcheon as Uncle Wally
 Bob McGrath as Bob
 Roscoe Orman as Gordon
 Ward Saxton as Mike
 David Smyrl as Mr. Handford
 Lillias White as Lillian
 Alexis Cruz as Alex

Muppet performers
 Caroll Spinney as Big Bird, Oscar the Grouch and Bruno the Trashman
 Frank Oz as Cookie Monster, Bert, and Grover
 Fran Brill as Prairie Dawn and Little Bird
 Jerry Nelson as Count von Count, Herry Monster, Boy and Two-Headed Monster (left head)
 Kevin Clash as Elmo, Hoots the Owl, and Wolfgang the Seal
 Richard Hunt as Forgetful Jones, and Two-Headed Monster (right head)
 Martin P. Robinson as Mr. Snuffleupagus, Telly, Fish and Buster the Horse
 David Rudman as Athena and Chicago the Lion
 Fred Garbo Garver as Barkley
 Judy Sladky as Alice Snuffleupagus
 Camille Bonora as Ruby
 Pam Arciero as Telly (assistant)
 Bryant Young as Mr. Snuffleupagus (assistant)
 Jim Martin as Goat
 Additional Muppets performed by Rick Lyon, Joseph Mazzarino, Carmen Osbahr

Special guest stars
 Maria Conchita Alonzo
 Candice Bergen
 Nancy Cartwright as Bart Simpson
 Dan Castellaneta as Homer Simpson
 Ray Charles
 Chubby Checker
 Glenn Close
 Tyne Daly
 Geena Davis
 Bo Diddley
 Roger Ebert
 Charlayne Hunter-Gault
 Whoopi Goldberg
 Jeff Goldblum
 Kadeem Hardison
 Bo Jackson
 Julie Kavner as Marge Simpson
 Kid 'n Play
 Robert MacNeil
 Lou Diamond Phillips
 Julia Roberts
 Gene Siskel
 Jeff Smith
 Yeardley Smith as Lisa Simpson
 Tracey Ullman
 Blair Underwood
 Malcolm-Jamal Warner
 Robin Williams

Credits
 Directed by: Jon Stone
 Written by: Judy Freudberg
 Head Writer: Norman Stiles
 Segment Writers: Sonia Manzano, Cathi Rosenberg-Turow
 Segment Directors: Lisa Simon, Emily Squires
 Songs by: Carol Hall and Christopher Cerf, Sara Compton, Jeff Moss, Joe Raposo, Mark Saltzman, Norman Stiles, Jon Stone
 Music Director and Skating Waltzes Composed by: Stephen Lawrence
 Monster in the Mirror: Maria Conchita Alonzo, Candice Bergen, Ray Charles, Chubby Checker, Glenn Close, Tyne Daly, Geena Davis, Bo Diddley, Robert Ebert, Jeff Goldblum, Kadeem Hardison, Charlayne Hunter-Gault, Bo Jackson, Kid n' Play, Robert MacNeil, Lou Diamond Phillips, Julia Roberts, The Simpsons, Gene Siskel, Jeff Smith, Tracey Ullman, Blair Underwood, Malcolm-Jamal Warner
 Skaters: April Allen, Michael A. Belgrave, Omar Gross, Suzin Rae, Samantha Spivack, Darrel Wacker
 Skating Choreographer: April Allen
 Puppets, Costumes, Props: Caroly Wilcox and Ed Christie with Mark Zeszotek, Paul Hartis, Barry Link, Peter MacKennan, Connie Peterson, Stephen Rotondaro
 Puppet Design Consultants: Michael K. Firth, Bonnie Erickson
 Music Coordinator: Danny Epstein
 Associate Music Director: Dave Conner
 Production Supervisor: Frieda Lipp
 Associate Director: Ted May
 Production Designer: Victor DiNapoli
 Costume Designer: Bill Kellard
 Graphic Artist: Mike Pantuso
 Set Decorator: Nat Mongioi
 Art Director: Bob Phillips
 Production Stage Managers: Chet O'Brien, Ric E. Anderson
 Stage Manager: Robert J. Emerick
 Production Assistants: Cher Jung and Tim Carter, Gabrielle Howard, Leslie Brothers, Christine Ferraro
 Assistants to the Producers: Danette DeSena, Carol D. Mayes
 Script Coordinator: Thelma Moses
 Curriculum Coordinator: Diane P. Mitchell
 Children's Casting: Kim J. Wilson
 Technical Director: Ralph Mensch
 Audio: Blake Norton, Tim Lester
 Lighting Director: Bill Berner
 Camera: Frank Biondo, Dave Driscoll
 Unit Manager: Eleanor McIntosh
 Sound Effects: Dick Maitland
 Make-up: Lee Halls
 Hair Stylist: Karen Specht
 Wardrobe: Grisha Mynova
 Director of Research: Valeria Lovelace, Ph.D.
 Coordinating Producer: Arlene Sherman
 Producer: Lisa Simon
 Executive Producer: Dulcy Singer
 Vice President for Production: Franklin Getchell
 Studio facilities by: Unitel Video, Inc.
 Remote facilities by: The Video Center of New Jersey
 Special thanks to The Wollman Rink City of New York Department of Parks and Recreation
 "SESAME STREET" and the "SESAME STREET" sign are registered trademarks and service marks of Children's Television Workshop.
 © 1991 Children's Television Workshop · Sesame Street Puppet Characters © 1991 Jim Henson Productions, Inc. All Rights Reserved
 This program has been made possible by the financial support of viewers like you.

External links

Sesame Street features
1990s American television specials
1991 television specials
The Simpsons
Television crossover episodes